Li Feng (died 254), courtesy name Anguo, was a Chinese politician of the state of Cao Wei during the Three Kingdoms period of China. He was a trusted official of the third Wei emperor Cao Fang, and did not follow the regent Sima Shi's wishes.

In 254, in company with Xiahou Xuan and Zhang Ji (張緝), he plotted to kill Sima Shi. However, Sima Shi sensed their scheme and summoned Li Feng to meet him in the palace, where he interrogated Li Feng and killed him. He was then accused of treason and his family members were executed as well.

Family
Li Feng's father, Li Yi (李義), previously served as Minister of the Guards (衛尉) in the Cao Wei state.

Li Feng's first son, Li Tao (李韜), married Grand Princess of Qi (齊長公主), a daughter of the second Wei emperor Cao Rui. Li Feng's daughter, Li Wan (李婉), married Jia Chong but was sentenced to exile after her father's downfall.

See also
 Lists of people of the Three Kingdoms

References

 Chen, Shou (3rd century). Records of the Three Kingdoms (Sanguozhi).
 Fang, Xuanling (ed.) (648). Book of Jin (Jin Shu).
 Pei, Songzhi (5th century). Annotations to Records of the Three Kingdoms (Sanguozhi zhu).

Year of birth unknown
254 deaths
3rd-century executions
Cao Wei politicians
Executed Cao Wei people
People executed by Cao Wei